Humane Society International Australia (HSIA) is the Australian branch of Humane Society International (HSI), an offshoot of the international animal protection organisation, The Humane Society of the United States (HSUS).

History 

Humane Society International (HSI) was established in the United States in 1991. The Australian branch of HSI was the second HSI office to open under the emerging global program, in 1994. The office, located in Sydney, has been operating for two decades under the direction of Verna Simpson and Michael Kennedy. HSI Australia works on national and international conservation and animal protection policy and law, with a special responsibility to reach out to its regional neighbors.

At its 1994 inception, the Australian program ran on a budget of less than A$50,000. A few years later, HSI Australia became a regional NGO with a team of staff & consultants, members across the country, and a budget of $2.5 million. HSI Australia also supports activities internationally.

Rationale 

HSI Australia’s vision is consistent with the founding vision of HSI: to change the way people interact with animals and their environments through education and advocacy. The organisation works to protect animals through the development of more ecologically sustainable and humane practices. It runs numerous conservation and animal protection campaigns that cover a broad range in both marine and terrestrial areas.

HSI Australia also assists the campaigns of international branches of HSI, such as the anti-Canadian seal hunt and the anti-wildlife trade campaigns. The organisation supports grants and programs across Asia and Africa.

Campaigns and areas of focus

Farm animal welfare  
The organisation is opposed to the export of live animals from Australia , and believes that the frozen meat market is a readily available and ethical option for the industry. Factory farming is a particular focus, as HSI Australia believes that factory farming practices cause unnecessary suffering. The organisation works with the Australian Competition and Consumer Commission (ACCC) regarding legislation for pork and poultry, which includes their truthful labeling campaign.
Humane Choice - True Free Range, is an accreditation program in which farms can become accredited to Humane Choice standards and be recognised as a 'True Free Range' producer.

Animal testing  
Alongside Humane Research Australia, HSI Australia helped pass the End Cruel Cosmetics Bill, which was introduced by Australian Greens senator Lee Rhiannon. Through the Bill, HSI Australia seeks to achieve a national testing and sales ban in Australia and New Zealand.

Marine campaigns  
HSI Australia publicly criticizes Japanese whaling and the Western Australian shark cull. The organisation is a member of the Antarctic Ocean Alliance.

HSI Australia's initial legal action against Japan's scientific whaling led to an International Court of Justice (ICJ) case, which ruled in March 2014 that Japan's plan lacked scientific merit. Following the announcement of Japan's "Newrep-A" plan, scheduled to commence in December 2015, senior program officer Alexia Wellbelove stated: "It is now time that Japan listened to international public opinion and consigned their so-called research program and plans to resume commercial whaling to history where it belongs."

HSI Australia is against the use of lethal shark control measures within Australia, and has spoken out about the lack of scientific evidence behind the use of such practices as a mitigation strategy. HSI Australia also campaigned alongside its international counterparts to ban the Canadian seal hunt, and is pushing for an end to the trade.

Racing  
HSI Australia has taken a critical stance on horse racing, specifically steeplechase, due to the horse deaths and injuries that occur. HSI Australia is campaigning towards its ban in all states.

The group also campaigns against Australian Greyhound racing, with a focus placed upon the New South Wales (NSW) sector of the industry. HSI Australia seeks greater transparency in the industry, including stricter welfare standards, and better reporting and investigation of cruelty and mistreatment.

Fur trade  
HSI Australia works alongside HSUS, HSI Canada and HSI in the United Kingdom (UK) to highlight the practices of the global fur industry. Within Australia, HSI Australia successfully lobbied for a ban on the import of cat and dog fur, and praises designers and retailers who participate in the ban on fur.

The dog meat trade is an ongoing campaign that HSI is working on with its partners, including the Soi Dog Foundation.

Threatened ecological communities  
HSI Australia is committed to long term conservation initiatives, and nominates ecological communities under threat for listing under both the Commonwealth Environment Protection and Biodiversity Conservation Act, 1999 (EPBC Act) and the New South Wales Threatened Species Conservation Act, 1995 (TSC Act).

Climate change  
HSI Australia aims to combat climate change through the protection of biodiversity.

Wildlife trade  
Through representation at international conferences such as CITES, HSI Australia works to combat the global trade in wildlife.

Wildlife Land Trust 
In 2007, HSI launched the Wildlife Land Trust Australia (WLT). The principle of WLT is "humane stewardship" for the purpose of developing a network of permanent sanctuaries throughout the country as well as internationally.

Humane Choice 
Humane Choice was launched by HSI Australia in 2006. It is a certification scheme that indicates the humane treatment of farm animals.

Places You Love Alliance 
HSI Australia is a member of the Places You Love Alliance, a campaign which includes other not-for-profit environmental advocacy groups, such as The Wilderness Society and the International Fund for Animal Welfare Australia.

Publications 
HSI Australia produces numerous publications:

 "Newsletter" - for supporters, featuring project updates and news.
 "Extinction Denied Technical Bulletin" - reporting on domestic and international projects, targeted towards scientific peers.
 "Campaign Report" - annual campaign reports summarizing HSI Australia's yearly activities.
 "Wildlife Lands" - newsletter of WLT.

See also 
 Animal welfare and rights in Australia

References

Bibliography

External links 
 
 YouTube channel

Non-profit organisations based in New South Wales
Animal welfare organisations based in Australia